Patricia Klesser is a South African former cricketer who played as a wicket-keeper. She made appearances against England during their 1960/61 tour for both South African XI and Southern Transvaal B before replacing Eleanor Lambert as wicket-keeper for the third Test match, the only match she played for South Africa. She batted at number eleven in both innings, and scored 4 & 0* as South Africa lost by 8 wickets. She primarily played domestic cricket for Northern Transvaal.

References

External links
 
 

Living people
Date of birth missing (living people)
Year of birth missing (living people)
Place of birth missing (living people)
South African women cricketers
South Africa women Test cricketers
Northerns women cricketers
Wicket-keepers